Institute of Information Technology, University of Dhaka (IITDU) is an educational institution aimed at developing efficient human resource in the field of information technology. IIT currently offers Bachelor of Science in Software Engineering (BSSE), Master of Science in Software Engineering (MSSE), Masters in Information Technology (MIT) and Post Graduate Diploma in Information Technology (PGDIT).

Establishment
In the annual session of June 2001, The Dhaka University Senate established the Institute of Information Technology (IIT) by converting the erstwhile Computer Center (established in 1985). The aim was to train skilled manpower in the field of information technology (IT) and to establish computer network in the University.

List of directors

References

External links 
 The Official Website of Institute of Information Technology, University of Dhaka
 Effects of Internship on Fresh Graduates: A case study on IIT, DU students.

University of Dhaka
Information technology schools
Information technology in Bangladesh
Information technology research institutes